The Sixth Mother of all Battles Championship, commonly referred to as the 1996 Iraqi Elite Cup, was the sixth occurrence of the Iraqi Elite Cup, organised by the Iraq Football Association. The top eight teams of the 1995–96 Iraqi Advanced League competed in the tournament. The competition started on 10 September 1996 and ended on 20 September 1996 where, in the final, held at Al-Shaab Stadium, Al-Quwa Al-Jawiya defeated Al-Zawraa 1–0.

Group stage

Group 1

Group 2

Semifinals

Third place match

Final

References

External links
 Iraqi Football Website

Football competitions in Iraq
1996–97 in Iraqi football